SBQ can mean or refer to:

 Brazilian Chemical Society (Sociedade Brasileira de Química)
 Ringway Centre (also called SBQ), a Grade B locally listed building in Birmingham, England
 Schoolboy Q, American rapper
 Sibi Airport (IATA: SBQ), an airport located in Sibi, Balochistan, Pakistan
 Sobhaga railway station (station code: SBQ), Pakistan
 Special bar quality, the basic or standard quality for carbon steel bars; see Republic Steel
 Suicide Behaviors Questionnaire-Revised (SBQ-R)
 Sutherland Brothers and Quiver, a touring two-band combination from Britain in the 1970s